Saltley Academy is a mixed secondary school located in the Bordesley Green area of Birmingham, in the West Midlands of England.

History
Saltley Grammar School opened in the 1920s; by the 1960s it had upwards of 800 pupils.  In the 1970s it was "converted" to a community school administered by Birmingham City Council. The school also gained specialist status as a Science College.

In 2014 Saltley School was placed in special measures by Ofsted after a critical inspection report. The inspection had been undertaken after Saltley School had been connected to the Operation Trojan Horse scandal which affected a number of schools in Birmingham in 2014.

Saltley School converted to academy status in March 2015 and was renamed Saltley Academy. The school is now part of the Washwood Heath Multi-Academy Trust which includes Brownmead Primary Academy and Washwood Heath Academy.

Saltley Wellbeing Centre
Saltley Wellbeing Centre (formerly Saltley Community Leisure Centre) adjoins the Saltley School complex. The centre offers sports and leisure facilities for the local community as well as for use by the school.

Notable former pupils

Saltley Grammar School

 Neal Abberley, cricketer for Warwickshire
 Sir Richard Barratt CBE, Chief Constable from 1975 to 1978 of South Yorkshire Police
 Robert Kilroy-Silk, Labour MP from 1983 to 1986 for Knowsley North and from 1974 to 1983 for Ormskirk
 Maureen Jennings, novelist
 Carl Wayne, lead singer for The Move
 Prof Michael John Wise, Professor of Geography from 1958 to 1983 at the LSE

References

Secondary schools in Birmingham, West Midlands
Academies in Birmingham, West Midlands